is a Japanese total medical supply enterprise that treats the medical supply and sanitary items such as condoms. Headquartered in Chuo-ku, Osaka, Japan. The company was founded on December 7, 1960.

Outline
A manufacturer that chiefly handles condom for sanitary items and family planning and medical supplies such as lubrication jellies and ED measures commodities. Moreover, the brand that treats baby goods "CHUCHUBABY" is possessed (Describe it later about the CHUCHUBABY). A lubrication jelly (Jelia skin) was developed first domestically, and the name of Nihon-Jelia
industrial place. The name of the company is changed to Jex at the same time as advancing to the baby business in 1972. Absorption has amalgamated the CHUCHUBABY by the business integration in 2004 though the CHUCHUBABY is established as related companies in 1997. It consists of five businesses (LOVERS (sanitary items and condom, etc.), WOMAN (Health & beauty and jelly of the character pleasure, etc.), senior (senior life caring product, so-called ED measures,), baby&mother (baby goods), and medical (medical treatment articles)).

CHUCHUBABY 
Baby and maternity business that started in 1972. The number of items increases from the latter half of the 1980s though the first commodity is only a nursing bottle and a nipple. Penguin's design has a wide commodity group like tablewares, bath oil, and the skin care creams, etc. from the detergent for various babies in the trademark. The management integration is done again in 2004 though it became independent as related companies in 1997. URL on the website becomes independent, and is considered so that it is not easy to be linked with the website of Jex.

Products

Condoms
Usu usu
Usui
Dot the Dot
Hot cap
Honey cap
Glamorous Butterfly
Strong
XOXO Condom

Jelly
Lubejelly
Dr.G
JELLY PLUS+

SOFT DEMAND Series

Nursery item / CHUCHU series
Nursing bottle, nipple, and milking machine, and so on.

Maternity articles
Mama's undergarment
Mother's milk putt

Product for medical institution
Projelly
Procover
Proskin
Healing cool foam
Healing cool Jel
Healing hot jel
Jex meter
Tsukerudake
Etak

Headquarters
2-3-12, Tanimachi, Chuo-ku, Osaka, Japan

References

External links
 JEX Co.,Ltd.-Executive Message-
 CHUCHUBABY 

Manufacturing companies established in 1960
Companies based in Osaka Prefecture
1960 establishments in Japan